Qi Tianyu (born 22 January 1993) is a Chinese footballer who currently plays as a midfielder for Shandong Taishan in the Chinese Super League.

Club career
After playing in the youth squad of Shandong Luneng Taishan, Qi started his professional football career in 2011. He played for Shandong Youth in the China League Two and scored 2 goals in 16 appearances in the season. Qi was promoted to Shandong Luneng's first team squad by Henk ten Cate in 2012. In August 2013, he was loaned to Campeonato de Portugal side Casa Pia for one season. However, he didn't register to play for Casa Pia due to injury. On 22 April 2015, he made his debut for the club in the 2015 AFC Champions League against Becamex Bình Dương with a 3–1 victory, coming on as a substitution for Liu Binbin in the 84th minute. He made his Super League debut in the first match after Felix Magath took charge of the team on 19 June 2016, in a 0–0 draw against Shanghai SIPG. He became a regular starter and made 11 league appearances in the 2016 season. 

In January 2019, Qi extended his contract with the club until the end of the 2021 season. He would go on to establish himself as a squad regular within the team that won the 2020 Chinese FA Cup against Jiangsu Suning F.C. in a 2-0 victory. A consistent versatile regular within the team, he would gain his first league title with the club when he was part of the team that won the 2021 Chinese Super League title. This would be followed up by him winning the 2022 Chinese FA Cup with them the next season.

Career statistics 
Statistics accurate as of match played 31 January 2023.

Honours

Club
Shandong Luneng/ Shandong Taishan
Chinese Super League: 2021
Chinese FA Cup: 2014, 2020, 2021, 2022.
Chinese FA Super Cup: 2015

References

External links
 

1993 births
Living people
Chinese footballers
Footballers from Shandong
Sportspeople from Jinan
Shandong Taishan F.C. players
Chinese Super League players
China League Two players
Association football midfielders